The 1917 Chicago White Sox dominated the American League with a record of 100–54. The 100 wins is a club record that still stands. Their offense was first in runs scored while their pitching staff led the league with a 2.16 ERA.

Facing the New York Giants in the 1917 World Series, the team clinched the series in six games, thanks in large part to the workhorse efforts of Eddie Cicotte and Red Faber. It would be the team's last world championship until 2005.

Regular season

Season standings

Record vs. opponents

Game log

|- align="text-align:center; bgcolor="#bbffbb"
| 1 || April 11 || @ Browns || 7–2 || Scott || @ Hamilton || Danforth || 18,000|| 1.57 || 1–0 || || 
|- align="center" bgcolor="#ffbbbb"
| 2 || April 13 || @ Browns || 3–4 || Koob || Faber || Sothoron || 1,000 || 2:11 ||1–1 || – || 
|- align="center" bgcolor="#bbffbb"
| 3 || April 14 || @ Browns || 11–0 || Cicotte
| Hamilton || || 10,000  || 2:02 || 2–1 || || ||
|-align="center" bgcolor="#bbffbb"
| 4 || April 15 || @ Tigers || 6–2 || Scott|| Covelski || || 15,473 || 1:35 || || || ||
|- align="center" bgcolor="#bbffbb"
| 5 ||April 16 || @ Tigers || 4–0  || Faber || Jones || || 5,200 || 1:41 || 3–1 || – || 
|- align="center" bgcolor="#bbffbb"
| 6 || April 17|| @ Tigers  || 4–2 || Danforth || Ehmke || Russel || 3,353 || 1:50 || || – || 
|- align="center" bgcolor="#ffbbbb"
| 7 || April 19 || Indians || 2–6 || Plank || Scott ||  || 28,000 || 1:58 || || || 
|- align="center" bgcolor="#bbffbb"
| 8 || April 20 || Browns || 5–2 || Cicotte || Sothoron  || || 6,000 || 1:48 || || || 
|- align="center" bgcolor="#bbffbb"
| 9 || April 21 || Browns || 2–0 || Faber || Koob || || 14,000 || 2,000 || || ||  
|- align="center" bgcolor="#bbffbb"
| 10 || April 22 || Browns || 3–2 || Williams || Groom || || 25,000 || 1:59 || || || 
|- align="center" bgcolor="#bbffbb"
| 11 || April 24 ||Indians || 1–0 || Scott || Coveleski || || 5,000 || 1:43 || || || 
|- align="center" bgcolor="#ffbbbb"
| 12 || April 25 ||Indians || 1–4 || Coumbe || Cicotte || || 1,000 || 1:47 || || || 
|- align="center" bgcolor="#ffbbbb"
| 13|| April 26 || Indians || 0–3 || Bagby || Faber || || 2,500 || 1:48 || || || 
|- align="center" bgcolor="#ffbbbb"
| 14 || April 27 || Indians || 1–2 || Klepfer || Scott || Covelski || 4,000  || 2:02 || || ||
|- align=" bgcolor="#ffbbbb"
| 15 || April 28 || Tigers || 3–8 || Faber || Jones || || 4,200 || 2:36 || || || 
|- align="center" bgcolor="#ffbbbb"
| 16 || April 29 || Tigers || 0–3 || Mitchell || Faber ||  || 12,000 || 1:42  || ||  ||
|-

Roster

Player stats

Batting

Starters by position 
Note: Pos = Position; G = Games played; AB = At bats; H = Hits; Avg. = Batting average; HR = Home runs; RBI = Runs batted in

Other batters 
Note: G = Games played; AB = At bats; H = Hits; Avg. = Batting average; HR = Home runs; RBI = Runs batted in

Pitching

Starting pitchers 
Note: G = Games pitched; IP = Innings pitched; W = Wins; L = Losses; ERA = Earned run average; SO = Strikeouts

Other pitchers 
Note: G = Games pitched; IP = Innings pitched; W = Wins; L = Losses; ERA = Earned run average; SO = Strikeouts

Relief pitchers 
Note: G = Games pitched; W = Wins; L = Losses; SV = Saves; ERA = Earned run average; SO = Strikeouts

Awards and honors

League top five finishers 
Eddie Cicotte
 #1 in AL in wins (28)
 #1 in AL in earned run average (1.53)
 #2 in AL in strikeouts (150)

Happy Felsch
 #2 in AL in runs batted in (102)

1917 World Series 

There were accusations of this series not being completely "on the level," especially after the Black Sox Scandal of 1919. The most notable play involved Heinie Zimmerman of the Giants chasing Eddie Collins across home plate in the deciding game. Zimmerman was later banned from organized baseball for throwing games.

AL Chicago White Sox (4) vs. NL New York Giants (2)

Notes

References
1917 Chicago White Sox at Baseball Reference

Chicago White Sox seasons
American League champion seasons
World Series champion seasons
Chicago White Sox season
Chicago White